Untold Story, Vol. 2 is a compilation album by American hip hop recording artist The Game. It was released independently on July 26, 2005, for Get Low Recordz. The album proved to be another success for The Game despite being released independently, peaking at #61 on the Billboard 200, #29 on the Top R&B/Hip-Hop Albums and #7 on the Independent Albums.

Track listing

2005 albums
The Game (rapper) albums
Sequel albums